Ricardo Eugênio Boechat (July 13, 1952 – February 11, 2019) was a Brazilian news anchor. He worked for newspapers such as O Globo, O Dia, O Estado de São Paulo and Jornal do Brasil. Before his death, he was active as a news director and radio anchor at BandNews FM and held a position as television anchor at Jornal da Band. Boechat won three Esso Journalism Awards. He entertained a weekly column at news magazine IstoÉ, and in 2002 authored the book Copacabana Palace.

Career
Boechat began his career in 1970 as reporter at the newspapers O Estado de S. Paulo, Jornal do Brasil, and the now extinct Diário de Notícias. In 1983 went to the newspaper O Globo. In 1987 he served a six-month term as the Secretariat of Social Communication in the government of Moreira Franco (1987–1991). After fulfilling that commitment he returned to O Globo. At the same time, he began teaching at the College of the City of Rio de Janeiro, where he was involved in editing the monthly newsletter. He hosted a radio news program on BandNews FM, served as an anchor on the news program Jornal da Band, wrote a column for the newspaper O Dia in Rio de Janeiro, and a weekly column in the magazine Isto É.

Boechat voiced a jaguar newscaster in the Brazilian version of the American animated film Zootopia (Zootropolis). Other versions of Zootopia released in other countries use different newscaster characters.

Personal life
Boechat was first married to Claudia Costa de Andrade and they had four children. He later married Veruska and they had two children.

Death

Boechat died in a helicopter crash on February 11, 2019, near São Paulo, Brazil. Four days later, the Legal Medical Institute published that a politraumatic head injury caused the death of the journalist.

References 

1952 births
2019 deaths
People from Buenos Aires
Argentine emigrants to Brazil
Brazilian people of French descent
Brazilian people of Swiss descent
Brazilian atheists
Brazilian journalists
Brazilian columnists
Brazilian Jews
Brazilian radio personalities
Radio and television announcers
People from Rio de Janeiro (city)
Victims of aviation accidents or incidents in Brazil
Victims of aviation accidents or incidents in 2019
Victims of helicopter accidents or incidents
20th-century journalists
21st-century journalists